Nocardioides pakistanensis is a Gram-positive and non-spore-forming bacterium from the genus Nocardioides which has been isolated from water from the hot spring Tatta Pani in Pakistan.

References 

 

pakistanensis
Bacteria described in 2016